Established in 1993, The Investment and Development Agency of Latvia, or LIAA in short, acts under the Ministry of Ministry of Economics of the Republic of Latvia. 

Kaspars Rožkalns has served as the director of the LIAA since 2020.

According to the OECD, 2020 official development assistance from Latvia increased by 14.8% to US $40.2 million.

LIAA strategic goals 
LIAA has the following goals: promoting the competitiveness and export capacity of Latvian companies on the international market, promoting the growth of foreign investment, implementing the national tourism development policy and national innovation policy.

LIAA Aims and objectives

Aims 

 Carrying out measures that increase the export capacity of Latvian companies and promoting foreign trade;
 Attracting foreign investment to Latvia;
 Promoting startup companies and their development, innovations, and technology transfer;
 Promoting innovative businesses, including collaborations between the science sector and the corporate sector;
 Implementing measures in accordance with state aid programs;
 Administering activities co-financed by EU funding programs and other foreign financial instruments;
 Carrying out functions specified in the Tourism Law.

Objectives 

 Advising entrepreneurs on foreign markets, ways to start business partnerships, and helping them with business networking.
 Organizing services that boost exports on foreign markets: national booths at international exhibitions abroad and trade missions.
 Attracting foreign investment, including support services for new potential investors and aftercare of existing investors, which is geared towards productivity growth, introduction of new technologies and innovations in the priority areas of the POLARIS process, a foreign direct investment strategy. 
 Providing innovation support and its promotion in Latvia.
 Ensuring that the newly established businesses and their growth in the regions of Latvia is viable, as well as setting up businesses related to the creative industries and their development in Latvia.
 Carrying out promotional activities (marketing activities) that position Latvia as a tourist destination on foreign target markets.
 Implementing measures that improve the competitiveness of Latvian tourism industry and promote domestic tourism.
 Ensuring that LIAA’s provision of services and its development is customer-oriented and is using all available resources and optimization opportunities.

Investments 
One of LIAA’s subactivities is attracting investment from foreign investors for Latvian investment projects and their further development. Examples of investment projects include businesses operating in Latvia, prospective new businesses, as well as state and municipal projects.

Priority areas for attracting foreign investment include metalworking and mechanical engineering, transport and logistics, information technologies, life sciences, health care, wood industry, green technology, and food industry. LIAA also supports the attraction of foreign investment for manufacturing projects that fall outside the priority areas.

Polaris process 
Polaris process makes foreign investment attraction to Latvia more efficient by determining investment target sectors, summarizing and updating the newest findings in scientific fields that are related to their respective sectors, suggesting projects to foreign investors, and managing collaborations between Latvian national authorities, municipalities, the private sector, and scientific institutions.

Promotion of foreign trade
LIAA is in charge of organizing the following activities that contribute to export-oriented business development:

Trade missions 
LIAA organizes business trips to foreign countries, which includes business forums, workshops, entrepreneur roundtable discussions, contact exchanges, visiting trade fairs, individual meetings with potential business partners, as well as informal events.

Export seminars 
LIAA organizes export seminars that deal with the key elements of export and provide information on news and trends on foreign markets, as well as the European Single Market.

Contact exchanges 
LIAA holds prearranged bilateral business meetings between businesses from two or more countries, both as one of activities during trade missions, fairs or other events, and as a separate event.

Individual visits 
LIAA takes part in organizing individual business visits to potential foreign partners, mainly in countries that have a LIAA representative offices or an Embassy of the Republic of Latvia.

Tourism
In 2016, Tourism Development State Agency (TAVA) was added to LIAA, which now form the Tourism department. The aim of LIAA Tourism department is to put the national tourism policy into practice, i.e., to promote the development of Latvian tourism products and services, make Latvia internationally known, position Latvia as an attractive tourist destination, and promote the competitiveness of Latvian tourism.

Foreign economic representative offices
LIAA foreign economic representative offices are located in the United States (Washington, D.C.), the United Arab Emirates (Dubai), Belarus (Minsk), Denmark (Copenhagen), France (Paris), Italy (Rome), Japan (Tokyo), Kazakhstan (Almaty), Russia (Moscow), China (Beijing, Shanghai, and Ningbo), the United Kingdom (London), Lithuania (Vilnius), the Netherlands (The Hague), Norway (Oslo), Poland (Warsaw), Singapore, Finland (Helsinki), Germany (Berlin, Frankfurt), Sweden (Stockholm).

Business incubators 
Starting October 2016, 15 business incubators are active in Latvia (Bauska, Daugavpils, Jelgava, Jēkabpils, Jūrmala, Kuldīga, Liepāja, Madona, Ogre, Rēzekne, Sigulda, Talsi, Valmiera, Ventspils, and a creative industries incubator in Riga), which provide support for startups and their development.

Technology transfer program 
The program’s activities are focused on commercializing research results provided by scientific institutions and turning research results into successful businesses.

Innovation incentive program 
The goal of the innovation incentive program is to inform society and encourage them to start their own innovative businesses, using awards as an incentive mechanism. In the same way, it is planned to inform society on developments related to innovations and their potential, as a result encouraging society and entrepreneurs to focus on developing and using innovative solutions, as well as increasing the share of innovative businesses in the economy and motivating them to start businesses in the areas defined and prioritized in the Smart Specialization Strategy of Latvia.

Enterprise Europe Network 
On February 29, 2008, Enterprise Europe Network started its activities as one of the LIAA departments.

Magnetic Latvia, business information center at Riga International Airport 
 
On February 27, 2018, Magnetic Latvia, a business information center, opened at Riga International Airport Departure Terminal C.

Significant events held by LIAA 
iNovuss, Export and Innovation Awards, Magnetic Latvia Forums, Creative Business Cup, Latvian Tourism Forum, Mechanical Engineering and Metalworking Business Forum, Lingerie Industry Forum.

LIAA databases and industry directories 
LIAA operates Food Products in Latvia, a database of Latvian food and beverage products.

LIAA oversees EXIM, an international trade portal that includes Latvian company profiles, business cooperation offers, information on events, market reviews, and electronic catalogs for specific industries (Chemistry, Pharmacy and Biotechnology, Construction and Building Materials, Design in Latvia, Electronics and Electrical Manufacturing and Engineering, Food, Forestry and Woodworking, Information and Telecommunications Technology, Mechanical Engineering and Metalworking, Printing and Packaging, Textile and Clothing, Transit and Logistics, Environment and Renewable Energy Industry, Wellness Services and Products).

References

External links
 Investment and Development Agency of Latvia website

Government of Latvia
Economy of Latvia
Investment promotion agencies